Childhood arthritis (also known as juvenile arthritis or pediatric rheumatic disease) is an umbrella term used to describe any rheumatic disease or chronic arthritis-related condition which affects individuals under the age of 16. Most types are autoimmune disorders.

Signs and symptoms
Several types of childhood arthritis exist, including juvenile idiopathic arthritis,  juvenile myositis, juvenile lupus, juvenile scleroderma, vasculitis, and fibromyalgia.

General signs of childhood arthritis disorders include: 

 Joints: Swollen, stiff, red, warm, and/or painful joints
 Eyes: Painful/dry eyes, sensitivity to light and/or difficulty seeing caused by uveitis
 Skin: Scaly red rash (psoriatic), light spotted pink rash (systemic), butterfly shaped rash across the bridge of the nose and cheeks (lupus) or thick, hardened patches of skin (scleroderma)
 Organs: Digestive tract (diarrhea and bloating), lungs (shortness of breath) and heart
 Other: Fatigue, appetite loss, and/or high, spiking fever

The most common type of childhood arthritis, juvenile idiopathic arthritis (previously known as juvenile rheumatoid arthritis (JRA) or juvenile chronic arthritis (JCA)) can be divided into three main forms: The classification is based upon symptoms, number of joints involved and the presence of certain antibodies in the blood.
Polyarticular arthritis is the first type of arthritis, which affects about 30–40% of children with arthritis and is more common in girls than boys. Typically five or more joints are affected (usually smaller joints such as the hands and feet but many also affect the hips, neck, shoulders and jaw). 
Oligoarticular (aka pauciarticular) arthritis can be early or late onset and is the second type of arthritis, affecting about 50% of children with juvenile arthritis. This type affects fewer than four joints (usually the large joints such as knees, ankles or wrists) and may cause eye inflammation in girls with positive anti-nuclear antibodies (ANA). Girls younger than eight are more likely to develop this type of arthritis. 
Systemic disease is the least common form, with 10–20% of children (boys and girls equally) being affected with limited movement, swelling and pain in at least one joint.

Cause
In most cases, juvenile arthritis is caused by the body attacking its own healthy cells and tissues, i.e. autoimmunity, causing the joint to become inflamed and stiff. Once the joint has become inflamed and stiff, damage is done to the joint and the growth of the joint may by changed or impaired. The underlying cause in the malfunction of the autoimmune system is unknown; dietary habits and emotional state seem to have no effect on the disease.

Diagnosis
Early diagnosis and treatment by a pediatric rheumatologist or a rheumatologist can help manage inflammation, relieve pain, and prevent joint damage. However, it is difficult for doctors to diagnose the disease. Careful examination, laboratory tests (blood and urine), and various forms of imaging like X-rays may be some of the tests conducted by a doctor. Doctors may perform some of the following tests to diagnose the condition 

 ANA (Antinuclear Antibody) Test
 Joint Aspiration
 Rheumatoid Factor (RF) Test

Treatment
The treatment of most types of juvenile arthritis include medications, physical therapy, splints and in severe cases surgery. Methotrexate is commonly prescribed to children with juvenile arthritis. These treatments are focused on reducing swelling, relieving pain and maintaining full movement of joints. Children are encouraged to be involved in extra-curricular activities, physical activity when possible, and to live a "normal" life.

Epidemiology
In the US it affects about 250,000-294,000 children making it one of the most common groups of childhood diseases.

References

External links 

 National Institute of Arthritis and Musculoskeletal and Skin Diseases - US National Institute of Arthritis and Musculoskeletal and Skin Diseases

Rheumatology
Inflammatory polyarthropathies